In American English, a gym bag or carryall is a large bag made of cloth or leather typically with a rectangular base and a zippered opening at the top. Two handles enable the bag to be carried, and a (usually removable) strap lets the user support the bag on the shoulders.

In British English, the same kind of bag is called a sports bag. A holdall (or occasionally hold-all) may be a similar bag but may often have wheels and possibly a telescopic handle. The term covers a wide variety of types of bag.

Uses
A holdall is often used in place of a suitcase or for carrying sports equipment, and has the advantage over most suitcases of being compressible when empty.

A 'hold-all' is also used to carry bedding and blankets etc. Students, enrolled in boarding schools in India, are issued a 'hold-all' to carry their blankets, quilts and clothes. It is a flat, rectangular, canvas bag, when unravelled. Once filled, it is rolled like a sleeping bag and held together with straps.

See also
 Duffel bag

References

Bags